Element Girl is a superheroine appearing in American comic books published by DC Comics. The character first appeared in Metamorpho #10 (February 1967), written by Bob Haney and drawn by Sal Trapani. Element Girl's death was featured in Neil Gaiman's Sandman series in issue #20, "Façade". A similar character named Element Woman appeared during the events of Flashpoint and later appearing in The New 52 as part of the Justice League. Both characters are similar in design to Metamorpho and have the same powers.

Fictional character biography

Element Girl
Urania "Rainie" Blackwell began as a spy for the United States government. Her first major assignment was to infiltrate a European crime syndicate called Cyclops and get a firsthand look at the workings of its leader, a man code-named Stingaree. She soon fell in love with him, and agreed to marry him, only to have him spurn her when his mercurial affections turned elsewhere. In turn, Blackwell managed to convince her agency that the romance had been a sham, as part of her role, and asked their help in finding some way to strike back at Stingaree. The agency obliged by offering her the chance to take part in a long-planned experiment.

A few months earlier, an adventurer and soldier of fortune named Rex Mason had entered the Egyptian pyramid of Ahk-Ton on a treasure hunt. There he had been exposed to the radiation of a buried meteor, part of the great Orb of Ra, and had been transformed into Metamorpho the Element Man. Blackwell volunteered to duplicate Mason's encounter, and consequently found herself, once inside the pyramid, molded by the mystical sun god Ra into an elemental with superpowers identical to Mason's.

Blackwell, now calling herself Element Girl, sought out Metamorpho and recruited his help in her mission to destroy Stingaree. Together they destroyed Cyclops, and the two allies found themselves in danger of becoming a romantic pair, much to the dismay of Metamorpho's fiancee, the debutante Sapphire Stagg. Though it was obvious to Mason that he and Blackwell were kindred spirits, he eventually severed his ties with her to salvage his relationship with Sapphire. This abandonment devastated Blackwell. Overnight, she found herself cast back into the "real world", a place where men and women labored in mundane nine-to-five jobs and where contact with superhumans like her was limited to television newscasts and the occasional fleeting glimpse of an Earthbound demigod. She turned to the agency for help and acceptance, but their activities had become delicate and covert; their missions were such that a "metamorphosized freak" like her would be more of a hindrance than a help.

Her insecurities caused problems, and in later years when her feelings for Metamorpho went unrequited, she became isolated. Blackwell found herself utterly alone, ostracized by the employers who had helped destroy her humanity and terrified of interacting with more normal-looking men and women. For years she endured a completely insulated existence, living on a disability pension and for the occasional phone call from the agency. Abandoned by her employers and unwilling to face the world, Blackwell attempted suicide many times, but her powers saved her every time.

Eventually, Death of The Endless helped Blackwell. Death stated that she could not personally help Blackwell, since Blackwell's immortality and powers had originated from the sun god Ra. Death revealed that Blackwell was one of many "metamorphae" created by Ra to battle the god Apep, "the serpent that never dies". Death comments on the irony of this, stating that Apep is long dead. Death then tells Blackwell how to ask Ra to remove her "gift", by looking straight into the Sun and asking him, and Blackwell finally dies, leaving behind a disintegrating husk of a body with an expression of pure joy.

Element Girl appeared again as Rex Mason's sidekick in the "Metamorpho" feature of the summer series Wednesday Comics. This feature is written by Gaiman with art by Mike Allred and occurs outside of DC continuity.

Element Woman

Emily Sung, the Element Woman, first appears during the "Throne of Atlantis" crossover as one of Cyborg's new recruits for the Justice League. During a battle with a number of Atlantean soldiers loyal to the Ocean Master, Element Woman nonchalantly chats with Black Lightning, expressing joy over being asked to join the League.

She is later inducted into the League alongside a new female Atom and Firestorm. Her relation to Metamorpho is unknown. However, she does reference him by first name.

After the events of Forever Evil, Element Woman joins the Doom Patrol.

Flashpoint
Prior to appearing in the mainstream DC Universe, Element Woman made her debut in the alternate Flashpoint universe. She first appears at a meeting of superhumans assembled by Cyborg with the intention of stopping an oncoming war between the Amazons and Atlanteans. She offers her help, but is dismissed by Shade, the Changing Man, who uses his M-Vest to reveal to the others that Element Woman is insane. She subsequently reappears in Metropolis, where she rescues Cyborg, Batman and the Flash from a group of soldiers working for the mysterious Project Superman. She then reveals that she has been following Cyborg ever since his initial failed attempt to recruit the heroes to stop the war, and that she wishes to help him.

Emily continues to accompany the new gathering of heroes as they travel to visit the members of SHAZAM. Despite her social awkwardness, she offers to help the group and joins the mission to the elevated coast of New Themyscira. After the death of Billy Batson, Emily uses her powers to protect the remaining children alongside Cyborg.

Powers and abilities
Like Metamorpho's original powers, Element Girl (and Element Woman) could transform her body into any of the elements naturally found in the human body and shape them at her will. She can change her hair color using metals, and she can create silicate faces that fall off after a while. She uses the faces for ashtrays. She said she once tried to transmute her body into flesh, but this experience ended badly and she vowed never to try it again.

Other versions
Emily Sung appears in DC Bombshells.

Quotes from Neil Gaiman
Neil Gaiman, author of the Sandman comic book series, discussed the death of Element Girl in an interview with Comix Experience:

 Neil Gaiman: There's one called "The Death of Element Girl", in which Sandman probably won't even appear. He might appear, I dunno. That has Death, and an old DC character called Element Girl, who nobody remembers any more.

 Comix Experience: From Metamorpho.

 Neil Gaiman: Yeah. The Lady Metamorpho. So famous she never even made it into Who's Who. Anyway, she's in there. Terribly sad story.

Although she did not have an entry in the original series, Element Girl received an entry in Who's Who in the DC Universe #10 (June 1991), stamped "DECEASED" after her appearance in Sandman.

References

External links
The Sandman Annotations

DC Comics characters with accelerated healing
DC Comics female superheroes
Fictional female secret agents and spies
DC Comics characters who are shapeshifters
Korean superheroes
The Sandman (comic book)
Comics characters introduced in 1967
Comics characters introduced in 2011
Characters created by Bob Haney
Fictional characters with elemental transmutation abilities